The following is a list of county-maintained roads in Sibley County, Minnesota, United States. Some of the routes included in this list are also county-state-aid-highways (CSAH).

Route list

References

 

Sibley
Transportation in Sibley County, Minnesota